The Ministry of Education and Religious Affairs is a government department of Greece. One of the oldest ministries, established in 1833, it is responsible for running the country's education system and for supervising the religions in Greece. The incumbent minister is Niki Kerameus.Greece is one of the two countries that have not signed the Lisboa convention which has been ratified by all 47 member states of the Council of Europe in Strasbourg (2012).To this day,  the independent department of professional recognition of academic degrees called ATEEN, still acts illegally against graduates of recognized open universities. In 2023, the Council of State published its decision against the ministry's actions of the discriminative non-recognition of degrees.

History

Current leadership

 Minister for Education and Religious Affairs: Niki Kerameus
 Deputy Minister (responsible for primary, secondary and special education): 
 Deputy Minister (responsible for higher education):

List of ministers

Ministers for National Education and Religious Affairs (1981–2009)

Ministers for Education, Lifelong Learning and Religious Affairs (2009–2012)

Ministers for Education, Religious Affairs, Culture and Sport (2012–2013)

Ministers for Education and Religious Affairs (2013–2015)

Ministers for Culture, Education and Religious Affairs (2015)

Ministers for Education, Research and Religious Affairs (2015–2019)

Minister for Education and Religious Affairs (since July 2019)

References

External links
Ministry website

1833 establishments in Greece
 
Greece
Government ministries of Greece
Lists of government ministers of Greece
Ministries established in 1833
Religion in Greece